Martin Romberg (born 3 January 1978) is a Norwegian classical composer. He is one of the most active orchestral composers of his generation in Scandinavia. He is mostly known for his J.R.R Tolkien and fantasy literature inspired orchestral and choral works.

Biography 
Being born to a working-class family in Oslo, Romberg early moved out of Norway to study classical music at the University of Music and Performing Arts Vienna, Austria, from 1997 to 2005. Breaking the bond with modernist tradition and his composition teacher Michael Jarrell, he embraced neo-romanticism from 2006. 
His works has since been published by Éditions Billaudot in Paris and interpreted by numerous orchestras in the world including The Astana Symphony Orchestra, The Bergen Philharmonic Orchestra, The Deutsches Filmorchester Babelsberg, Orchestre national Montpellier Languedoc-Roussillon, Akademische Orchestervereinigung Göttingen, Mittelsächsische Philharmonie, Orchestre régional de Normandie, Orchestre régional Avignon-Provence, Orchestre de Pau pays de Béarn, Telemark Kammerorkester, Nizhni Novgorod Philharmonic orchestra, Archangel State Chamber Orchestra, Orchestre National de Lille, The Saint-Petersburg Northern Synfonia Orchestra, Orchestre Philharmonique de Nice, Russian Camerata, Scarborough Symphony Orchestra and Nizhni Novgorod Soloists. 

 

 
 
 
 
 

 

  

He now lives between southern France and Norway where he is currently the musical director of the Rose Castle in Oslo.

Style and Music 
Romberg has been associated with the neo-romantic current of composers in his generation in Scandinavia and has on several occasions collaborated with the Norwegian painter Odd Nerdrum. 
He believes that J.R.R. Tolkien's concept of mythopoeia can be transferred to western classical music to infuse it with new energy, and has used the term Fantasy Music to describe his own music.

Collaborations 
He has on several occasions collaborated with other artists, notably the Norwegian electronica band Ulver conducting their live orchestral shows on stage, among others the MG_INC Orchestra and the Tasmanian Symphony Orchestra. In 2015 his one and a half hour long oratorio "Homériade" based on the mythic texts by the contemporary Greek poet Dimitris Dimitriadis, featuring Robin Renucci and the Orchestre régional Avignon-Provence, closed the 69th Avignon Festival. As a conductor he has worked with London Session Orchestra recording his own albums "Norse Mysteries" and "Scandi Drama" at Abbey Road Studios.

Works

Orchestra 
 Symphony of Saints symphonic poem for soprano and orchestra (2019/2020)
 Fëanor (after the Silmarillion  by J.R.R. Tolkien) symphonic poem (2017)
 Homériade (after the text by Dimitris Dimitriadis) oratorio for speaker and orchestra (2015)
 Telperion and Laurelin (after the Silmarillion  by J.R.R. Tolkien) symphonic poem (2013)
 Quendi (after the Silmarillion  by J.R.R. Tolkien) symphonic poem (2008) 
 Véttir symphonic ouverture (2006)
 The Wonderbird (after a tale from Kazakhstan) symphonic ballet in 18 movements (2006/2008) 
 Persian Nights symphonic poem (2005)

Concertos 
 Twilight Concerto (after a selection of poems by Robert E. Howard) concerto for cello and string orchestra (2021)
 Flores Malum (after a selection of poems by Charles Baudelaire) concerto for clarinet and string orchestra (2019) 
 Poemata Minora (after the poems by H.P.Lovecraft) concerto for violin and string orchestra (2015)
 Ramayan 3392 concerto for accordion and orchestra (2012/2013) 
 The Moon concerto for two violins and orchestra (2009/2010)
 The Tale of Taliesin concerto for alto saxophone and orchestra (2007)

Choral works 
 Requiem of Runes (after text fragments from Varangian runestones found in Sweden) for mixed choir and accordion (2021)  
 Streghe (after ancient Etruscan hymns) for girls choir (2012)
 Rúnatal (after stanza 138-146 from Hávamál ) for mixed choir (2012)
 Aradia or the Gospel of the Witches (after Charles Godfrey Leland's collection of writings on pagan witchcraft from Tuscany) for mixed choir (2011/2012)
 Eldarinwë Líri (after elven poems by J.R.R. Tolkien) for girls choir (2009/2010)

Piano 
 Tableaux d'or after 2 paintings by Gustav Klimt (2021)
 Fantasy Variations on a very famous theme by Ramin Djawadi (2021)
 Valaquenta II after the Silmarillion by J.R.R. Tolkien (2020)
 Tableaux Kitsch after 4 paintings by Odd Nerdrum (2014)
 Eärendil after the poem by J.R.R. Tolkien (2013)
 Valaquenta after the Silmarillion by J.R.R. Tolkien (2009)
 Tableaux Fantastiques after 10 paintings by Jacek Yerka (2008)

Chamber music 
 Moriquendi, for string quartet/string quintet (2021)
 Tableaux Féeriques, les Charmeurs, 13 small pieces for cello and piano (2014)
 The Tale of Slaine, for saxophone quartet (2010)
 Tableaux Féeriques, les Chuchoteurs, 17 small pieces for alto saxophone and piano (2011)

Discography 
 Lockdown Miniatures - Aurora (ACD5109) with Ole Martin Huser-Olsen, 2022
 Norwegian Saxophone - Lawo Classics (LWC1162) with Ola Asdahl Rokkones, Fabio Mastrangelo, 2018
 Homériade - Klarthe Records (KLA033), with Orchestre Régional Avignon-Provence, Robin Renucci, 2016
 Witch Mass - Lawo Music (LWM009) with Grex Vocalis, Det Norske Jentekor and Kammerkoret NOVA, 2015
 Sound Waves - Avie Records (AV2266) with Alexandra Silocea, 2013
 Valaquenta, Tableaux Fantastiques - Lawo Classics (LWC1022) with Aimo Pagin, 2011

Discography/ Sound Library 
 Norse Mysteries - Audio Network (ANW 2937) with London Session Orchestra and Kammerkoret NOVA, 2017
 Scandi Drama - Audio Network (ANW 3203) with London Session Orchestra, 2018

Discography/Arrangement 
 300 - Deutsche Grammophon (0289 479 0084 9 CD DDD GH) with Ingolf Wunder 2013
 Messe I.X-VI.X - Ulver, ULVER-TRICK051, Jester Records 2014

External links
 Official Homepage
 Audio Network
 Norsk Musikkinformasjon
 Interview with World Wide Kitsch
 IMDb
 The artists Youtube Channel

Notes

Norwegian classical composers
Norwegian male composers
21st-century classical composers
Living people
Composers from Oslo
1978 births
21st-century Norwegian male musicians